Mammoth Cave is a cave in the British Overseas Territory of Gibraltar.  The cave was discovered in August 1902, when blasting operations discovered a 350 ft by 70 ft high cave full of stalactites and stalagmites. It is located on the east side, 20 to 25 metres above the water catchments. It is one of the biggest caves in the area.

References

Caves of Gibraltar